Das Supertalent (season 2) is the second season of Germany's Got Talent franchise. Season 2 began on 18 October 2008. Owing to good ratings in season 1, the number of episodes was increased to seven; four audition shows, each one hour long and three live shows, each two hours long. The judges were Dieter Bohlen, Bruce Darnell and Sylvie van der Vaart. The last episodes were on 15 and 22 November. 44-year-old harmonica player Michael Hirte won the second season with 72.62 percent of the vote and won the 100,000 euros with it. On 5 December he released an album called Der Mann mit der Mundharmonika (The Man with the Mouth-organ) which placed No. 1 on the German Charts and did the same little later in Austria and Switzerland.

Semi-finals

Semi-finals 1

Semi-final 2

Final

Sources

Das Supertalent
2008 German television seasons